Luigi Barbiano di Belgioioso (August 29, 1803 – July 13, 1885) was an Italian politician. He was born in and was the last rector of Milan. He was a recipient of the Order of Saints Maurice and Lazarus. He died in Milan, Kingdom of Italy.

References

1803 births
1885 deaths
19th-century Italian politicians
Mayors of Milan
Recipients of the Order of Saints Maurice and Lazarus